The Lindesmith Center was an Open Society Institute project which has conducted research related to drug reform. It was founded in 1994 by Ethan Nadelmann with financial support from George Soros. The Center conducted some NIDA-funded studies on harm reduction.

In 2000, the Center and the Drug Policy Foundation were merged into the Drug Policy Alliance, with the Center being renamed The Lindesmith Library. The Drug Policy Foundation was a non-profit organization whose focus was public policy, advocating for harm reduction, sentencing reform for non-violent drug offenses, and the legal access to medical marijuana. Through the Drug Policy Alliance, the Lindesmith Library continues to distribute materials to community organizations seeking science-based information about drug use and misuse.

More than 15,000 documents and videos are freely available online through the website of the Drug Policy Alliance.

The name 'Lindesmith' refers to Alfred R. Lindesmith (1905–1991), a professor of sociology at Indiana University, who was a prolific writer on drug use and policy.

References

External links
Lindesmith Library online
Drug Policy Alliance website
Global Drug Policy Program

Drug policy organizations based in the United States
Drug policy reform